Tendam (formerly The Cortefiel Group) is a Spanish fashion retailer. Tendam is present in 79 countries with  1,462 directly operated stores and 594 franchises, a total of 2,056 points of sale.

History 
Tendam started out in 1880 as a family-run haberdashery store  on Calle Romanones in Madrid. The business  moved into  textile production and distribution, and in 1933  the company built the La Palma shirt factory. It was followed in 1945 by the tailoring factory, which in 1946 produced the first men's suits under the Cortefiel label. In 1954, and coinciding with the founding of Manufacturas del Vestido, the firm became a holding company.

The Group continued to grow during the 1980s with the creation of the men's tailoring brand Milano (1984) and its casual youth fashion brand, Springfield (1988). In 1989 the firm acquired Pedro del Hierro, and in 1993 launched women'secret, its underwear and swimwear brand created by and for women.

During the 1980s work also got underway on the diversification of the Group's retail formats. Its international expansion strategy dates back to 1993, although the period of fastest growth was registered between 2000 and 2003, when the sales surface area handled by the Group increased by more than 70%. In 2005 MEP Retail acquired a stake in the Group, bringing about a change in the share ownership and management team. This same period also saw a sharp rise in the Group's global franchise business.

The women'secret online store was launched in 2000, and 2010 saw the consolidation of the Group's ecommerce area with the creation of the SPF.com online store, followed  by further online stores from Pedro del Hierro, Cortefiel and Fifty Factory.

The Group has a network of international buying offices in Spain, Hong Kong and India. Distribution is centralised at the Madrid logistics platform, backed up by an additional centre in Hong Kong, supplying both the Group's own stores and franchises. The multibrand growth strategy has been further reinforced through international expansion and the development of the online channel.

Brands 
It is made up of four own brands: Cortefiel, Springfield, Women'Secret, Pedro del Hierro and an outlet chain: Fifty Factory. Each brand has its own design team as well as sales and management structure. They share the administration, finance, technology, expansion and sourcing and human resource divisions, as well as other corporate functions, based at the central offices in Madrid.

References 

Companies based in Madrid
Private equity portfolio companies
PAI Partners companies
Permira companies
Clothing brands of Spain
Clothing retailers of Spain
Online clothing retailers of Spain
Retail companies established in 1880